Walnford is an unincorporated community located along Crosswicks Creek within Upper Freehold Township in Monmouth County, New Jersey, United States. Walnford was named for Richard Waln, the original owner of the town site.

Historic Walnford is an open-air museum operated by the Monmouth County Park System. It is part of Crosswicks Creek Park.

History
In 1772, Richard Waln (1737–1809), a Philadelphia merchant, purchased several mills in the area, which he then named Walnford. He built a two and one-half story house here in 1773. The property was inherited by his son, Nicolas Waln, and his descendants continued to live here for nearly 200 years.

Historic district

The Walnford Historic District is a  historic district encompassing the community along Walnford-Davis Station Road and Hill Road. It was added to the National Register of Historic Places on June 29, 1976 for its significance in agriculture and commerce. The district includes 16 contributing buildings and one contributing structure. It features the house built by Richard Waln in 1773, and the grist mill on Crosswicks Creek.

See also
 National Register of Historic Places listings in Monmouth County, New Jersey
 List of museums in New Jersey

References

External links
 

Upper Freehold Township, New Jersey
Unincorporated communities in Monmouth County, New Jersey
Unincorporated communities in New Jersey